Giovanni Lindo Ferretti (born 9 September 1953) is an Italian singer-songwriter, composer, and author. He is considered to be one of the founders of Italian punk rock music.

Biography
Ferretti was born in Cerreto Alpi (frazione of Collagna), in the province of Reggio Emilia, in the western part of the Italian region of Emilia-Romagna. After completing his studies and working as a psychiatric nurse for five years, Lindo Ferretti traveled around Europe.

CCCP

In East Berlin, he met Massimo Zamboni, with whom, in 1982, he founded the band CCCP Fedeli alla linea ("CCCP Loyal to the Line"). CCCP soon became a benchmark of the so-called "alternative music" in Italy. The band dissolved in 1990.

CSI

In 1992, again with Massimo Zamboni and with an original core member of the Italian band Litfiba, Gianni Maroccolo, he founded a new band called Consorzio Suonatori Indipendenti (Consortium of Independent Players), also known as CSI. This band continued until 2000, when Zamboni departed. The bands’ names followed the naming of the political entities of the Soviet Union and its dissolution in the late 20th century. "CCCP" is the Cyrillic lettering for SSSR (i.e. USSR), and "CSI" mimics the Italian acronym for the Commonwealth of Independent States.

PGR

From 2002, he led the band PGR, an abbreviation of Per Grazia Ricevuta ("For a Received Grace"). This is a stock phrase usually attached to mementos acknowledging miraculous divine gifts. The new band name, in fact, marked his own rediscovery of his Catholic roots.

PGR's lineup changed with the release of the album D’anime e d’animali (2004), and in the fashion of previous incarnations the name was altered. In this case, however, the band's acronym was only slightly changed into PG3R (Però Gianni Giorgio Giovanni Resistono, meaning "Yet Gianni Giorgio and Giovanni Resist"). PGR toured again in 2006, with the tour entitled 'Ripasso / Ribassi – Saldi, fino ad esaurimento scorte’ (Revision / Discounts – Sales while Stock Lasts). With the release of the album Ultime notizie di cronaca in 2009, the band announced its dissolution.

Solo work and collaborations with other artists
In 2000, Ferretti published the book In Mongolia in retromarcia ("In Mongolia, in reverse"), co-authored with Massimo Zamboni, about their journey there. This trip also influenced CSI's third album, Tabula Rasa Elettrificata. Also in 2000 he released a solo album, Co.Dex.

In 2003, together with director Giorgio Barberio Corsetti, Lindo Ferretti wrote the texts and lyrics for the theatrical work Iniziali: BCGLF. The music was composed by fellow PGR member Gianni Maroccolo. A CD of the same name was released in 2004. Also in 2004 he released the album Litania ("Litany"), co-authored with Ambrogio Sparagna, which contains both folk prayers and pieces from the repertoire of CCCP and CSI.

He toured Italy again in 2005 with the theatrical shows Falce e Martello. Falciati e martellati. Requiem per una civiltà ("Hammer and Sickle. Hammered and Sickled. Requiem for a Civilisation"), with Ambrogio Sparagna, and Pascolare parole, allevare pensieri ("Pasturing words, Breeding thoughts"), with Lorenzo Esposito Fornasari, Raffaele Pinelli and Ezio Bonicelli.

Politics and recent activities
Radical left political thought marked much of Ferretti's musical and artistic output, and he had been involved with the extra-parliamentary radical group Lotta Continua. He subsequently revised his political thinking, however, and in the 2006 elections he voted for the right-center coalition.

In 2006, he published his first autobiographical book, Reduce ("Returned/Survivor"), in which he describes his new poetics and views on life through childhood memories, poems and invectives against the contemporary world. He accompanied the release of the book with a new show of the same name, featuring the same artists he had previously worked with on Pascolare parole, allevare pensieri.

Concerning his conversion to Roman Catholicism, he has said, "I was raised by my grandmother and parents as a Catholic. But I was also a child of the 1960s and I voluntarily adhered to communism, that pestilence of the soul that stole the best children from our families. In a certain sense I have returned home. But I cannot bear the idea of being an anti-communist with the same stupidity and spite as when I was an atheist and blasphemer. I want a bit more dignity than that."

His association with the Catholic organisation Communion and Liberation, led to his participation in their 2007 festival in Rimini, where he spoke at a meeting about the Priestly Fraternity of the Missionaries of St.Charles Borromeo.

Since Sunday 4 September 2011, he has been the author of a column on Avvenire, an Italian Catholic newspaper published by the Italian Episcopal Conference.

Lindo Ferretti currently lives in his native village, where he is a horse breeder.

Discography

Solo and collaborations
 Co.Dex; 2000
 Iniziali: BCGLF (Initials: BCGLF); Universal Music Italia, 2004, with Giorgio Barberio Corsetti
 Litania (Litany); 2004, with Ambrogio Sparagna

Books 
 Fedeli alla linea. Dai CCCP ai CSI (Loyal to the Line. From CCCP to CSI), Giunti 1997, 
 Il libretto rozzo dei CCCP e CSI (A Rough Booklet on CCCP and CSI), Giunti 1998, 
 In Mongolia in retromarcia (In Mongolia, in Reverse); Giunti 2000, with Massimo Zamboni. Out of Print
 Reduce (Returned/Survivor), Mondadori 2006, 
 Bella gente d'Appennino (Fine People of the Apennines), Mondadori 2009,

Filmography
 Anime fiammeggianti (Flaming Souls), 1994
 Tutti giù per terra (All Down to the Ground), 1997
 Intimisto; 2001
 Paz!; 2002
 Perduto amor (Lost Love); 2003
 Il vento, di sera (The wind, in the evening); 2004
 Craj – Domani; 2004

References

1953 births
CCCP Fedeli alla linea
Converts to Roman Catholicism from atheism or agnosticism
Italian composers
Italian male composers
Italian Roman Catholics
Italian male singers
Living people
People from the Province of Reggio Emilia